Åsbrink is a Swedish surname. Notable people with the surname include: 

Elisabeth Åsbrink (born 1965), Swedish author and journalist
Erik Åsbrink (born 1947), Swedish politician
Gösta Åsbrink (1881–1966), Swedish gymnast and modern pentathlete 
Pontus Åsbrink (born 1992), Swedish football player

Swedish-language surnames